Antonino Bonvissuto (born 8 August 1985) is an Italian footballer who plays for Polisportiva Castelbuono.

Biography

Early career
Born in Palermo, Sicily, Bonvissuto started his career at Fincantieri Palermo. In 2003, he left for Vicenza on loan, along with Alessandro Borgese. He made his Serie B debut on 12 June 2004, against Livorno. He then spent 2 seasons in Serie C2, for Olbia and Ancona. He joined Borgese for the latter. In 2006, he was sold to Manfredonia in a co-ownership deal in multi-year contract, joining Gaetano Bertini. Manfredonia acquired the remain 50% registration rights from Vicenza in June 2007, but on 1 September he was sold to Lanciano. He scored 7 goals in his second Serie C1 season.

Bari
He signed a pre-contract with Serie B club Bari in April, and presented on 1 July. In August, he left for fellow second division club Cittadella. He scored 6 goals in his true maiden Serie B season. That season Bari won the cadetto (champion), Bonvissuto again was not inside the team plan. He left for newly promoted team Crotone and scored a career high of 9 goals.

In July, he was signed by Ascoli, his fifth Serie B club. However, he only played 10 times in the league. In January 2011 he left for Lega Pro Prima Divisione (ex–Serie C1) club Sorrento.

He returned to the city of Bari for 2011–12 pre-season, wore an unusual 91 shirt. On the same day that Bari signed Marcos de Paula, Bonvissuto left the club.

Frosinone
In August 2011 he left for another L.P. Prime Division club Frosinone in a 1+2-year contract. He played a successive games in the league, which he started every game except the first round as sub and suspended for 3 games from round 7 to 9. Most of the game he partnered with Salvatore Aurelio. (as of 30 October 2011)

Cremonese
On 12 October 2012 Bonvissuto was signed by Cremonese.

Reggiana
On 17 January 2013 Bonvissuto was signed by Reggiana.

Torres
In summer 2013 he was signed by Torres.

Arezzo
In summer 2014 he was signed by Arezzo.

Vigor Lamezia
On 21 August 2015 Bonvissuto was signed by Vigor Lamezia.

References

External links
 
 Lega Serie B Profile 
 
 Football.it Profile 
 FIGC 

Italian footballers
Serie B players
L.R. Vicenza players
Olbia Calcio 1905 players
A.C. Ancona players
Manfredonia Calcio players
S.S. Virtus Lanciano 1924 players
S.S.C. Bari players
A.S. Cittadella players
F.C. Crotone players
Ascoli Calcio 1898 F.C. players
A.S.D. Sorrento players
Frosinone Calcio players
Footballers from Palermo
1985 births
Living people
Association football forwards
S.E.F. Torres 1903 players